Brad Johnson may refer to:

Brad Johnson (actor, born 1924) (1924–1981), American actor, deputy Lofty Craig on Annie Oakley
Brad Johnson (actor, born 1959) (1959–2022), American actor, former Marlboro Man
Brad Johnson (Montana politician) (born 1951), American politician
Brad Johnson (American football) (born 1968), former quarterback
Brad Johnson (Australian footballer) (born 1976), former Australian rules footballer
Brad Vee Johnson (born 1961), American singer
Bradley Tyler Johnson (1829–1903), American Civil War general, writer, and politician
Bradley Johnson (born 1987), English professional footballer

See also
Brad Johnstone (born 1950), New Zealand sportsman